Hip Hing Construction Group Ltd. is a general contractor based in Hong Kong SAR, engaging in various types of construction and civil engineering projects serving the Hong Kong SAR Government and various other domestic and foreign entities in the public and private sector, e.g. Public Housing Estates in Hong Kong and highways. The Company has a strategic partnership with leading international oilfield services company Schlumberger Limited.

History
Hip Hing Construction Ltd., the Company's predecessor, was founded in British Hong Kong in March 1961 by Dr. Cheng Yu-tung, Dr. David Sin and Mr. Yan Kao. In 1973, the Company was restructured to become an affiliate of New World Development. In 1997, the Company was acquired by NWS Holdings Ltd., the service operations flagship of New World Development.

Link
Hip Hing Construction Company Limited

References

NWS Holdings
Construction and civil engineering companies established in 1961
Construction and civil engineering companies of Hong Kong
1961 establishments in Hong Kong